Rifle Range is a locality in the Somerset Region, Queensland, Australia.

Geography
Lockyer Creek marks the suburbs northern and western boundary.

There is irrigated cropping in areas close to the creek with grazing on native vegetation in the middle of the locality. The southern part of the locality is most rural residential.

Rifle Range Road provides access into the locality from neighbouring Lowood.

History 

A rifle range was first established near Lowood in 1886. The south-east boundary of the rifle range is the present-day south-eastern boundary of the locality of Rifle Range (Plan CC58 Lot 461) and presumably the origin of its name. The Lowood rifle range closed in 1953.

Education 
There are no schools in Rifle Range. The nearest primary schools are in neighbouring Clarendon, Lowood and Mount Tarampa. The nearest secondary school is in Lowood.

References

Suburbs of Somerset Region
Localities in Queensland